The Road is a 1961 English-language novel by Mulk Raj Anand. The main character Bhikhu bears many similarities to the character Bakha in Anand's earlier novel Untouchable.

References

Novels by Mulk Raj Anand
1961 novels
Novels set in India
1961 Indian novels